Donald "Dek" Bake (born February 6, 1984) is an American football defensive end who was formerly a member of the Saskatchewan Roughriders.

He was originally signed by the New York Giants as an undrafted free agent in 2007 but spent the entire campaign on the injured reserve list.

He played college football at Texas Tech.

Early years
Bake played high school football at Cordova High School in Rancho Cordova, California.

External links
Texas Tech Red Raiders bio

1984 births
Living people
Sportspeople from Sacramento, California
American football defensive tackles
American football defensive ends
Texas Tech Red Raiders football players
New York Giants players
Saskatchewan Roughriders players